Bam's Bad Ass Game Show is an American game show that premiered April 14, 2014, on TBS. It featured contestants attempting to perform a series of stunts orchestrated and created by Jackass star Bam Margera. Contestants were instructed to perform a series of stunts while competing against each other, in the hope of winning a grand prize of $10,000 dollars. As well as setting up challenges for contestants, the show featured many cameo appearances by the crew themselves. The series was green-lit for a six-episode first season in January 2013.

Episodes

References

External links
 
Official Website (via Internet Archive)

2010s American comedy game shows
2014 American television series debuts
2014 American television series endings
English-language television shows
TBS (American TV channel) original programming
Practical jokes
CKY
Jackass (TV series)